Navès is a municipality of the comarca of the Solsonès in the province of Lleida, Catalonia, Spain.

References

External links 
Official website
 Government data pages 

Municipalities in Solsonès
Populated places in Solsonès